Victoria Lust (born 2 May 1989 in Luton) is a former professional squash player who represented England. She reached a career-high world ranking of World No. 12 in June 2019.

Career
In 2016, she was part of the English team that won the silver medal at the 2016 Women's World Team Squash Championships. Two years later in 2018, she was again part of the English team that won the silver medal at the 2018 Women's World Team Squash Championships.

She retired from professional squash in March 2020.

References

External links 
 
 
 

1989 births
Living people
English female squash players
Sportspeople from Luton
People from Luton